No. 66 Squadron was a Royal Flying Corps and eventually Royal Air Force aircraft squadron.

History

World War I
It was first formed at Filton on 30 June 1916 as a training squadron equipped with Royal Aircraft Factory BE2, BE12s and the Avro 504.  The squadron received its first Sopwith Pup on 3 February 1917, and deployed to Vert Galand in the Somme, France on 12 March 1917. The Pups were exchanged for Sopwith Camels during October 1917 and the squadron moved to join No. 14 Wing in Italy.

During twelve months of fighting in Italy the squadron destroyed 172 enemy aircraft. On 13 March 1918 Lieutenant Alan Jerrard engaged nineteen enemy aircraft on his own; he managed to destroy three before he was forced to land and taken prisoner. He was awarded the squadron's only Victoria Cross for his efforts.

At the end of the war the squadron stayed on in Italy for a few months, returning to the United Kingdom in March 1919 and was disbanded on 25 October 1919.

Flying aces
The 21 aces who had served with the squadron during the Great War were:
William George Barker VC, 
Alan Jerrard VC, 
Peter Carpenter, 
Harry King Goode, 
Francis S. Symondson, 
Gerald Alfred Birks, 
Charles M. Maud, 
Gordon Apps, 
Hilliard Brooke Bell, 
Christopher McEvoy, 
Harold Ross Eycott-Martin, 
William Myron MacDonald, 
Augustus Paget, 
John Oliver Andrews, 
Harold Koch Boysen, 
William Carrall Hilborn, 
Thomas Hunter, 
James Lennox, 
Walbanke Ashby Pritt, 
Patrick Gordon Taylor and,
John (Jack) Wallis Bishop.

Second World War
It was reformed on 20 July 1936 from 'C' Flight, No. 19 Squadron RAF at RAF Duxford, initially being equipped with Gloster Gauntlets, before a slow conversion to Supermarine Spitfires from August 1938. The squadron was part of No. 12 Group RAF in Fighter Command and was on readiness from the start of the war in September 1939. The first contact with the enemy was an attack on a Heinkel He 111 of the Norfolk coast near Cromer, the German aircraft subsequently crashed in Denmark. The squadron moved to RAF Horsham St. Faith after Germany's invasion of Belgium and the Netherlands, the squadron destroyed its first enemy aircraft on 12 May 1940 over the Hague. At the end of August the squadron moved to the south of England as part of the Battle of Britain, it operated from  RAF Kenley, RAF Gravesend, RAF West Malling and by November to RAF Biggin Hill. By the time the Germans had stopped daylight bombing the squadron had destroyed 20 aircraft with another 17 probables and also damaged another fifteen.

On the 24th of February 1941 the squadron moved to RAF Exeter, before moving again in April to RAF Perranporth in Cornwall to operate fighter sweep missions over the Channel. It moved to Portreath in December 1941 and re-equipped with the Spitfire V. In April 1942 the squadron moved to RAF Ibsley and was involved in the support for the combined operations at Dieppe. By October 1942 the squadron was based at RAF Zeals in Wiltshire. It moved to RAF Sumburgh in the Shetland Isles in April 1943 to provide fighter cover for the British fleet based at Scapa Flow before returning to the West Country, firstly at RAF Church Stanton in Somerset and then back to Perranporth in Cornwall in October 1943.

In November 1943 the squadron moved to RAF Hornchurch and converted to the Spitfire IX and then moved to North Weald airfield in Essex at the end of February 1944. The squadron became part of the Second Tactical Air Force and provided air cover for the invasion forces in Normandy, being based in France from 22 June. After a break in South Wales the squadron continued to support the advancing allied forces being based at Abbeville in September 1944 and then on to Grimbergen in Belgium. In November the squadron converted to the Spitfire XVI before moving the Twente in the Netherlands where it disbanded on 30 April 1945.

Post-war
It was reformed at Duxford on 1 September 1946, by renumbering No. 165 Squadron RAF, initially with Spitfires. The following northern spring, the squadron converted to Meteors, which it flew for six years before reequipping with Sabres. At RAF Linton-on-Ouse in March 1956 it acquired Hawker Hunters, which it flew before being disbanded again on 30 September 1960 at RAF Acklington.

On helicopters
It reformed at RAF Odiham on 15 September 1961, from the Belvedere Trials Unit equipped with Bristol Belvedere helicopters. In June 1962 it left the UK for Seletar in Singapore, where it provided heavy lift helicopter support for forces operating in Malaya. The squadron finally disbanded on 17 March 1969.

References

Notes

Bibliography

 Corbin, Jim. Last of the Ten Fighter Boys. London: Sutton Publishing, 2007. .
 Forbes, Wing-Commander Athol, DFC, and Squadron-Leader Hubert R. Allen, DFC. Ten fighter boys: 66 Squadron RAF. Toronto, Canada: William Collins Sons & Co, 1942.
 Halley, James J. The Squadrons of the Royal Air Force and Commonwealth, 1918-1988. Tonbridge, Kent, UK: Air Britain (Historians) Ltd., 1988. .
 Jefford,  C.G. RAF Squadrons: A Comprehensive Record of the Movement and Equipment of All RAF Squadrons and Their Antecedents Since 1912, Shrewsbury, Shropshire, UK: Airlife Publishing, 1988. . (second revised edition 2001. .)
 Lucas, Percy Belgrave. Five Up: A Chronicle of Five Lives. Canterbury: Wingham Press, 1991. .(Autobiography of "Laddie" Lucas) (3rd revised edition published by Crécy Publishing, 1999)
 McCudden, Major James T.B. Flying Fury: five years in the Royal Flying Corps. London: Greenhill, 1930. (Republished 1987)
 Rawlings, John D.R. Fighter Squadrons of the RAF and Their Aircraft. London, Macdonald and Jane's, 1969 (Second revised edition 1976, reprinted 1978). .
 Taylor, Sir Gordon, GC (aka Captain P.G. Taylor, MC, 66 Squadron RFC) Sopwith Scout 7309. London: Cassell, 1968.

External links

 66 Squadron, RFC & RAF, 1916 to 1919 by John Grech 
 History of No.'s 66–70 Squadrons at RAF Web

066 Squadron
066 Squadron
Fighter squadrons of the Royal Air Force in World War II
Military units and formations established in 1916
1916 establishments in the United Kingdom
Military units and formations disestablished in 1969